The 1933 DePaul Blue Demons football team was an American football team that represented DePaul University as an independent during the 1933 college football season. The team compiled a 6–0–1 record, shut out five of seven opponents, and outscored all opponents by a total of 119 to 12. The team played its home games at Wrigley Field, Loyola Field, and Mills Stadium in Chicago. Jim Kelly and Ben Connor were the coaches.

Schedule

References

DePaul
DePaul Blue Demons football seasons
College football undefeated seasons
DePaul Blue Demons football